Amr Saad is an Egyptian actor. He graduated from the Faculty of Applied Arts. He began his artistic career in the late 1990s, when he first stood in front of the camera. Shahin, then the film Al Madina by Yusra Nasrallah, and then appeared in a short film entitled Ten pounds and then a legitimate betrayal.

In 2007, he presented the movie Dikan Shehata, which was praised by the critics. He then presented films such as The Big, Iron, Rijata, the Walls of the Moon, Molana and Karma.

He presented the first series in the drama in 2010, entitled Kingdom of the Mountain and then presented the series Abdul Aziz Street in 2011 and in 2012 presented the series Khirm needle, and then presented a second part of the series Abdel Aziz Street, and in 2016 presented the series Younis Born Silver, and in 2017 presented the series security situation.

He won the Best Actor Award for his role in the film Maulana from the 33rd Alexandria Film Festival and was also awarded to the Luxor Film Festival as well as the 66th Catholic Film Festival. He also won the Best Actor Award from the 23rd Mediterranean Film Festival of Tetouan on the role of «Sheikh Hatem» in the film Mawlana.

References

External links
.

Cairo University alumni
Egyptian male film actors
Egyptian male stage actors
Egyptian male television actors
Egyptian Muslims
Living people
Male actors from Cairo
Place of birth missing (living people)
Year of birth missing (living people)